Riggi is a surname and may refer to:

 Alessandro Riggi (born 1993), Canadian soccer player
 Chris Riggi (born 1985), American actor
 Giovanni Riggi (1925–2015), American mobster
 John Riggi, American television writer, producer, director and actor

Italian-language surnames